The St. John the Baptist Roman Catholic Church in Wilder, Kentucky is located at 1307 John's Hill Road near Northern Kentucky University.  It was listed on the National Register of Historic Places in 1980.

A stone church was built on the present site in 1858. The parish was begun by nine German immigrant families, 11 years earlier in 1847. The first church was a log cabin structure built on the top of John's Hill Rd.

The present site is in Campbell County, Kentucky overlooking the Licking River. During the American Civil War the site was used as part of the defense of Cincinnati, Ohio.

References

External links
 St. John's Church
Early photo

German-American culture in Kentucky
National Register of Historic Places in Campbell County, Kentucky
Roman Catholic churches in Kentucky
Roman Catholic Diocese of Covington
Churches in Campbell County, Kentucky
Churches on the National Register of Historic Places in Kentucky
Roman Catholic churches completed in 1858
Historic districts on the National Register of Historic Places in Kentucky
19th-century Roman Catholic church buildings in the United States
Georgian Revival architecture in Kentucky
1858 establishments in Kentucky